Saccorhytus (from Latin saccus "bag" and Ancient Greek ῥύτις rhytis "wrinkle") is an extinct genus of animal possibly belonging to the superphylum Ecdysozoa, and it is represented by a single species, Saccorhytus coronarius (from Latin attributive coronarius "[of a] crown"). The organism lived approximately 540 million years ago in the late Ediacaran Period. Initially proposed as a deuterostome, which would make it the oldest known species of this superphylum, it has since been determined to belong to a group called the ecdysozoans.

Fossils of the species were first discovered in the Kuanchuanpu Formation of Shaanxi province of China by a team of scientists from the United Kingdom, China and Germany, and the findings were first published in January 2017.

Description 

Saccorhytus was only about a millimetre (1.3 mm) in size and is characterised by its globular or hemispherical body with a prominent mouth. Its body was covered by a thick but flexible cuticle. It had four nodulate ridges above its mouth. Around its body are eight openings in the form of truncated cones with radial folds, termed "body cones." Two sets of small circular pores also occur on the body. One set is widely separated and runs parallel to the body cones. It may have had a sensory function, though they could have alternatively released internal contents like adhesive mucus or gametes. The other set is more dorsal and consists of sub-linear arrays. This set of pores may have housed bristles, which may have been used for touching the animal's surroundings and related functions, including temporary attachment.

There is no evident anus, which means that the animal must have consumed its food and excreted it from the same orifice, though the body cones may have served this function as well in addition to expelling water. However, the strong folding found in the fossils makes this conclusion tentative, with Simon Conway Morris, one of the British scientists involved in its discovery, admitting the possibility that the team simply has not spotted it.

Phylogeny 
Saccorhytus was initially classified as a deuterostome due to its possession of body openings in the form of its body cones, which appear similar to apparently equivalent structures in vetulicolians and vetulocystids, and thus was thought to be closely related to those two clades by Han et al. Below is a simplified phylogenetic tree based on that constructed by Han et al.

Since the earliest deuterostomes had a one-way through gut, the evident lack of an anus may either be a secondary loss (as seen in ophiurioids) or a plesiomorphic trait inherited from more primitive bilaterian ancestors, which may be linked to acoels and xenoturbellids.

In 2020, this classification was challenged, and it might have been an Ecdysozoan instead, possibly a stem group scalidophoran, due to its sclerites and posterial spines (when broken off look like body cones) similar to that of other scalidophorans, and the lack of cillia. Below is a simplified phylogenetic tree based on this classification.

Phylogenetic analyses published in 2022 indicate that the organism belongs to Ecdysozoa and not Deuterostomia. What were thought to be pharyngeal openings used to support the deuterostome hypothesis were found to be taphonomic artefacts.

Palaeoecology 
Saccorhytus most likely lived a meiofaunal lifestyle, with its body plan suited for an interstitial habitat, such as its thick but flexible cuticle providing protection and allowing it to wriggle through grains of sand, and the dorsal set of circular pores could have allowed it to attach itself to them. While feeding, the large quantities of water it would swallow would then be expelled through its body cones.

References 

Prehistoric animal genera
Fossils of China
Paleontology in Shaanxi
Fossil taxa described in 2017
Ediacaran Asia
Ediacaran